Kebu Omar Stewart (born December 19, 1973) is an American retired basketball player. He played in the NBA and had a rich international career, playing in several countries.

High school and college career
Stewart was a star high school player at national powerhouse Oak Hill Academy and later on at Our Saviour Lutheran in the Bronx, where he averaged nearly 36 points per game and earned honorable mention All American honors in the 1992–92 season.

Stewart signed to play at UNLV, but was academically ineligible his freshman year. He redshirted, and played the 1993–94 season with the Runnin' Rebels. Although Stewart wasn't eligible until January, he won Big West Conference Men's Basketball Player of the Year honors (becoming the first ever freshman to win the award), averaging 19 points and 12 rebounds per game. Stewart, who reportedly clashed with the coaching staff several times (even during the time when he on redshirt status), was suspended from the team after the following season. He later transferred to Division II Cal State Bakersfield, where he went on to become Division II Player of the Year and California Collegiate Athletic Association Player of the Year as a senior, leading the team to the NCAA Division II national championship. He also led the nation (Division II) in rebounding as a senior in 1996–97 with 13.4 rpg.

Professional career
Stewart was drafted by the Philadelphia 76ers in the 2nd round of the 1997 NBA Draft, and played 15 games during the 1997–98 NBA season, averaging 2.7 points and 2.1 rebounds per game. He played for the Sioux Falls Skyforce of the Continental Basketball Association (CBA) from 1998 to 2000. He was selected to the All-CBA First Team in 2000.

Stewart started his overseas career in Israel with Hapoel Jerusalem in the 2000–01 season. Then, he played for Avtodor Saratov and UNICS in Russia (2001–2003). He also played few games for Prokom Trefl Sopot (Poland) and Adecco Estudiantes (Spain), before signed for NIS Vojvodina (Serbia and Montenegro) in late 2003. After two seasons there, he moved to Italy and played for Vertical Vision Cantù in the 2005–06 season. In the 2006–07 season, he played for Seoul SK Knights (South Korea) and Crvena zvezda (Serbia). He last played for Barons/LMT Rīga (Latvia) in the 2007–08 season, but left the team during the first half of the season.

References

External links
 Kebu Stewart at ACB.com
 Kebu Stewart at Basketball-Reference.com

1973 births
Living people
African-American basketball players
American expatriate basketball people in Israel
American expatriate basketball people in Italy
American expatriate basketball people in Latvia
American expatriate basketball people in Poland
American expatriate basketball people in Russia
American expatriate basketball people in Serbia
American expatriate basketball people in South Korea
American expatriate basketball people in Spain
American men's basketball players
Basketball players from New York City
Atléticos de San Germán players
BC Avtodor Saratov players
BC UNICS players
BK Barons players
Cal State Bakersfield Roadrunners men's basketball players
CB Estudiantes players
Hapoel Jerusalem B.C. players
Israeli Basketball Premier League players
KK Crvena zvezda players
KK Vojvodina Srbijagas players
Korean Basketball League players
Liga ACB players
Pallacanestro Cantù players
Philadelphia 76ers draft picks
Philadelphia 76ers players
Power forwards (basketball)
Seoul SK Knights players
Sioux Falls Skyforce (CBA) players
Sportspeople from Brooklyn
Trefl Sopot players
UNLV Runnin' Rebels basketball players
21st-century African-American sportspeople
20th-century African-American sportspeople